Claudio Daniel Pérez (born 26 December 1985), nicknamed "Chiqui", is an Argentine football defender who plays for AD San Carlos.

Career
He started his career in Flandria as a central midfielder for then joining other teams from Buenos Aires.

In 2009, he played for Chilean club Deportes La Serena in the Primera División de Chile.

In 2011, he was signed by Belgrano in which he was part of a historical Ascent to Primera División after beating River Plate in two promotional games end in mid-2011.

In January 2013, he was acquired by Boca Juniors.

On 24 July 2018, Pérez joined IFK Värnamo in Superettan, Sweden's second tier. He left Sweden again at the end of the year, and signed with AD San Carlos in January 2019.

References

External links
 
 
 Profile at AD San Carlos

1985 births
Living people
Argentine footballers
Association football midfielders
Flandria footballers
Club Atlético Atlanta footballers
Club Atlético Belgrano footballers
Tiro Federal footballers
Club Atlético Tigre footballers
Boca Juniors footballers
Club Atlético Banfield footballers
Club Puebla players
IFK Värnamo players
Argentine Primera División players
Primera Nacional players
Chilean Primera División players
Superettan players
Liga FPD players
Argentine expatriate footballers
Expatriate footballers in Chile
Expatriate footballers in Mexico
Expatriate footballers in Sweden
Sportspeople from Buenos Aires Province